Discordia was an industrial band from Melbourne in the mid 90s. One of a number of bands with that name, it was formed from the ashes of Soulscraper. Discordia were set to be the first Australian band signed to Roadrunner records, but was not due to conflicts. Discordia began life when Sade Lava met James Lynch at Relic Records; the original concept was for Sade to join Soulscraper as vocalist. Over time it was felt a heavier direction was required, so James, Jim and Sade created Discordia.

Members

Original
 Greg Trull (Dreadnaught) – vocals
 Jim Shnookal (Soulscraper) – keyboards and programming
 James Lynch (Soulscraper, Shreen, Vicious Circle, Children of Sorrow, Good andEvil, The Prostitutes, Rope, Sweet Revenge, The Mumblers)- drums and programming
 Sade Lava (Ran Maclurkin) (Sickman, doll juice, Mince Kitten, Spine of God) – guitar, vocals, programming
 Fee Omens (Mince Kitten, Spine of God) – bass (live)

Later members
 Chris "Hilly" Hill (Damaged) – guitar
 Phaedra Press (Womnal)(Rope) – bass

Discography

EP
 Living Dead (1995) – Siren Entertainment
 Gunwitch (1996) – Siren Entertainment

LP
 Living Dead (1996) – Heartland Records

Other bands

Other musical groups named Discordia or a similar name, the type of music primarily associated with them, and their country of origin are below.
Discordia (Thrash Metal/Crossover) Argentina
Discordia (Industrial Metal) Australia
Discordia (Death Metal) Brazil
Discordia (Death Metal/Grindcore) El Salvador
Discordia (Atmospheric Black Metal) Germany
Discordia (Heavy Metal/Hard Rock) Italy
Discordia (Symphonic Metal) Japan
Discordia (Heavy Metal) Mexico
Discordia (Death/Thrash Metal) Poland
Discordia (Death Metal) Turkey
Discordia (Technical Death Metal) United States
Discordia (Symphonic Metal) United States
Discórdia Profana (Black Metal) Brazil
Immortal Discordia (Death Metal) Bulgaria
Omnia Discordia (Death Metal) United States
Ministério da Discórdia (Heavy/Thrash Metal) Brazil
Symphony of Discordia (Death/Doom Metal) Brazil
The Hearth of Discordia (Deathcore) Russia
Diskordia (a.k.a. Discordia) (Symphonic Doom Metal) United Kingdom

References

External links
 Discordia|MusicMight

Australian heavy metal musical groups
Victoria (Australia) musical groups
Industrial metal musical groups